Mouin AlKazmi is an Iraqi politician, Leading member of Badr Organization. He is a participant in the upcoming Iraqi elections for the Fatah Alliance. He is member of Baghdad Provincial Council.

Biography
AlKazmi, (Born in 1975, Baghdad Iraq) is an Iraqi politician and Assistant to the Deputy Chairman of the Popular Mobilization Forces for Combatant Affairs, Chairman of the committee to Commemorate the Tikrit Massacre.He entered the Iraqi elections as a candidate for the Fatah Alliance.

References

External links
 An Interview with Mouin AlKazmi on Alghad
 An Interview with Mouin AlKazmi on Al Rasheed TV

Badr Brigade members
Iraqi politicians
Iraqi soldiers
Living people
1975 births
People from Baghdad
Iraqi Shia Muslims